Universes is the second album from Birds of Tokyo, independently released on 5 July 2008, through MGM Distribution. The album was recorded at Loop Studios in West Perth, Wing Command in Perth, Western Australia and in "a big beautiful wooden house by the sea" at Injidup (Yallingup, Western Australia).

Mixing for the album took place in North Hollywood, California by Tim Palmer at Ameraycan Studios. During this mixing process the band filmed the music videos for "Broken Bones" and "Silhouettic" in Lancaster, California. These two music videos join together to form one complete story. However, the video for "Silhouettic", which features the second part of the story, was released first on the band's official website and their official Myspace page.

The debut single from the album, "Silhouettic", was released as a free download from the band's official website on 14 April 2008.

At the J Awards of 2008, the album was nominated for Australian Album of the Year.

The third single off the album, "Wild Eyed Boy", received significant airplay and was shown on Channel V.

Universes produced three songs on the Triple J Hottest 100, 2008 with "Wild Eyed Boy" at number 51, "Silhouettic" at number 22 and "Broken Bones" at number 20.

Track listing

Charts

Weekly charts

Certifications

Personnel
 Ian Kenny – vocals
 Adam Spark – guitars, vocals, keyboards
 Adam Weston – drums, percussion
 Anthonny Jackson – bass

Credits
 Produced by Adam Spark and Birds of Tokyo
 Engineered by Kieran Kenderessy and Adam Spark
 Mixed by Tim Palmer at Ameraycan Studios, North Hollywood, California
 Distributed by MGM Distribution Australia

References

2008 albums
Birds of Tokyo albums